Blastobasis tapetae is a moth in the  family Blastobasidae. It is found in Costa Rica.

The length of the forewings is 4.8–5 mm. The forewings are pale brown intermixed with brown scales. The hindwings are translucent pale brown, gradually darkening towards the apex.

Etymology
The specific name is derived from Latin tapeta (meaning a drapery or tapestry).

References

Moths described in 2013
Blastobasis